Laomedea flexuosa is a species of cnidarians belonging to the family Campanulariidae.

It is native to Europe and Northern America.

References

Campanulariidae